Tomasz Bednarek and Mateusz Kowalczyk were the defending champions, and won the title again by beating Andreas Siljeström and Igor Zelenay 6–2, 7–6(7–4).

Seeds

Draw

Draw

References
 Main Draw

2013 Sparkassen Openandnbsp;- Doubles
2013 Doubles